Fatimah Salem A. Baeshen is a public figure, author, and founder of AuthenticFi, a creative platform she established to motivate and inspire others in navigating life.  She consistently publishes on Medium and maintains a strong public presence, especially on social media, to disseminate life lessons across wider audiences based on her extensive professional background and personal growth. Her November 2020 post on "140 Life Lessons I Wish I Knew at 20" has further integrated public speaking, teaching, and writing into her career as it continues to gain traction among the broader public. On March 12, 2021, Baeshen officially published FSB140 into her first book, which serves as a paperback reference; dedicated to the classes of 2020, 2021, and 2022.  

Her breakout public role came in 2017 when she served as spokeswoman for the Embassy of Saudi Arabia in Washington, D.C. from September 26, 2017, to January 23, 2019. Baeshen was the first woman to hold a spokesperson position in the Saudi Arabian government.

Early life and education
Fatimah is of Saudi heritage and was born in the United States in Charleston, South Carolina. She grew up in Oxford, Mississippi, moved to New England for college and then the Midwest. She received a Bachelor of Arts in sociology from the University of Massachusetts Amherst Commonwealth Honors College and a Master of Arts at the Center for Middle Eastern studies (focusing on Islamic finance) from the University of Chicago.

Career
She has lived and worked in New York, Abu Dhabi, Chicago, Amherst, MA, Dubai, Jeddah, Kuala Lumpur, Riyadh, and Washington, D.C. She worked extensively as a consultant and civil servant. Eventually, her career in development and international affairs intersected with her background in consulting and communications. In September 2017, Baeshen was appointed Spokesperson for the Embassy of the Kingdom of Saudi Arabia, in Washington, D.C. She was the first woman to hold a spokesperson post for the Saudi government. In addition to her creative endeavor, AuthenticFi; she is also the Founder and Principal of Quantum, a niche international affairs advisory firm focused on facilitating socioeconomic progress.   

Previously, she also held positions with and/or advised AON, the Islamic Development Bank, the World Bank, Emirates Foundation for Youth Development, the Chalhoub Group, the Olayan Group, the Saudi Ministry of Labor, the Saudi Ministry of Economy and Planning, as well as, the G20 Saudi Secretariat.  

She has also been published in Arab News, Time, Al Arabiya and Islamic Finance News. She has appeared on outlets such as Fox Morning's with Maria, CBS, CNN, CGTN, BBC, ABC, PBS Newshour and MSNBC's The Point.

References

Living people
1981 births
People from Jeddah
University of Chicago alumni
Spokespersons
University of Massachusetts Amherst College of Social and Behavioral Sciences alumni
Consultants
Saudi Arabian expatriates in the United States
People from Oxford, Mississippi
21st-century Saudi Arabian writers
21st-century Saudi Arabian women writers